Jacques-Yves Cousteau,  (also , ; 11 June 191025 June 1997) was a French naval officer,  oceanographer, filmmaker and author. He co-invented the first successful Aqua-Lung, open-circuit SCUBA (self-contained underwater breathing apparatus). The apparatus assisted him in producing some of the first underwater documentaries.

Cousteau wrote many books describing his undersea explorations. In his first book, The Silent World: A Story of Undersea Discovery and Adventure, Cousteau surmised the existence of the echolocation abilities of porpoises. The book was adapted into an underwater documentary called The Silent World. Co-directed by Cousteau and Louis Malle, it was one of the first films to use underwater cinematography to document the ocean depths in color. The film won the 1956 Palme d'Or at the Cannes Film Festival and remained the only documentary to do so until 2004, when Fahrenheit 9/11 received the award. It was also awarded the Academy Award for Best Documentary in 1957.

From 1966 to 1976, he hosted The Undersea World of Jacques Cousteau, a documentary television series, presented on American commercial television stations. A second documentary series, The Cousteau Odyssey, ran from 1977 to 1982 on public television stations.

Biography

Early life
Cousteau was born on 11 June 1910, in Saint-André-de-Cubzac, Gironde, France, to Daniel and Élisabeth Cousteau. He had one brother, Pierre-Antoine. Cousteau completed his preparatory studies at the Collège Stanislas in Paris. In 1930, he entered the École navale and graduated as a gunnery officer. However, an automobile accident, which broke both his arms, cut short his career in naval aviation. The accident forced Cousteau to change his plans to become a naval pilot, so he then indulged his passion for the ocean.

In Toulon, where he was serving on the Condorcet, Cousteau carried out his first underwater experiments, thanks to his friend Philippe Tailliez who in 1936 lent him some Fernez underwater goggles, predecessors of modern swimming goggles. Cousteau also belonged to the information service of the French Navy, and was sent on missions to Shanghai and Japan (1935–1938) and in the USSR (1939).

On 12 July 1937, he married Simone Melchior, his business partner, with whom he had two sons, Jean-Michel (born 1938) and Philippe (1940–1979). His sons took part in the adventures of the Calypso. In 1991, six months after his wife Simone's death from cancer, he married Francine Triplet. They already had a daughter Diane Cousteau (born 1980) and a son, Pierre-Yves Cousteau (born 1982, during Cousteau's marriage to his first wife).

Early 1940s: innovation of modern underwater diving
The years of World War II were decisive for the history of diving. After the armistice of 1940, the family of Simone and Jacques-Yves Cousteau took refuge in Megève, where he became a friend of the Ichac family who also lived there. Jacques-Yves Cousteau and Marcel Ichac shared the same desire to reveal to the general public unknown and inaccessible places — for Cousteau the underwater world and for Ichac the high mountains. The two neighbors took the first ex-aequo prize of the Congress of Documentary Film in 1943, for the first French underwater film: Par dix-huit mètres de fond (18 meters deep), made without breathing apparatus the previous year in the Embiez islands in Var, with Philippe Tailliez and Frédéric Dumas, using a depth-pressure-proof camera case developed by mechanical engineer Léon Vèche, an engineer of Arts and Measures at the Naval College.

In 1943, they made the film Épaves (Shipwrecks), in which they used two of the very first Aqua-Lung prototypes. These prototypes were made in Boulogne-Billancourt by the Air Liquide company, following instructions from Cousteau and Émile Gagnan. When making Épaves, Cousteau could not find the necessary blank reels of movie film, but had to buy hundreds of small still camera film reels the same width, intended for a make of child's camera, and cemented them together to make long reels.

Having kept bonds with the English speakers (he spent part of his childhood in the United States and usually spoke English) and with French soldiers in North Africa (under Admiral Lemonnier), Jacques-Yves Cousteau (whose villa "Baobab" at Sanary (Var) was opposite Admiral Darlan's villa "Reine"), helped the French Navy to join again with the Allies; he assembled a commando operation against the Italian espionage services in France, and received several military decorations for his deeds. At that time, he kept his distance from his brother Pierre-Antoine Cousteau, a "pen anti-semite" who wrote the collaborationist newspaper Je suis partout (I am everywhere) and who received the death sentence in 1946. However, this was later commuted to a life sentence, and Pierre-Antoine was released in 1954.

During the 1940s, Cousteau is credited with improving the Aqua-Lung design which gave birth to the open-circuit scuba technology used today. According to his first book, The Silent World: A Story of Undersea Discovery and Adventure (1953), Cousteau started diving with Fernez goggles in 1936, and in 1939 used the self-contained underwater breathing apparatus invented in 1926 by Commander Yves le Prieur. Cousteau was not satisfied with the length of time he could spend underwater with the Le Prieur apparatus so he improved it to extend underwater duration by adding a demand regulator, invented in 1942 by Émile Gagnan. In 1943 Cousteau tried out the first prototype Aqua-Lung which finally made extended underwater exploration possible.

Late 1940s: GERS and Élie Monnier
In 1946, Cousteau and Tailliez showed the film Épaves ("Shipwrecks") to Admiral Lemonnier, who gave them the responsibility of setting up the Groupement de Recherches Sous-marines (GRS) (Underwater Research Group) of the French Navy in Toulon. A little later it became the GERS (Groupe d'Études et de Recherches Sous-Marines, = Underwater Studies and Research Group), then the COMISMER ("COMmandement des Interventions Sous la MER", = "Undersea Interventions Command"), and finally more recently the CEPHISMER. In 1947, Chief Petty Officer Maurice Fargues became the first diver to die using an aqualung, while attempting a new depth record with the GERS near Toulon.

In 1948, between missions of mine clearance, underwater exploration and technological and physiological tests, Cousteau undertook a first campaign in the Mediterranean on board the sloop Élie Monnier, with Philippe Tailliez, Frédéric Dumas, Jean Alinat and the scenario writer Marcel Ichac. The small team also undertook the exploration of the Roman wreck of Mahdia (Tunisia). It was the first underwater archaeology operation using autonomous diving, opening the way for scientific underwater archaeology. Cousteau and Marcel Ichac brought back from there the Carnets diving film (presented and preceded with the Cannes Film Festival 1951).

Cousteau and the Élie Monnier then took part in the rescue of Professor Jacques Piccard's bathyscaphe, the FNRS-2, during the 1949 expedition to Dakar. Thanks to this rescue, the French Navy was able to reuse the sphere of the bathyscaphe to construct the FNRS-3.

The adventures of this period are told in the two books The Silent World (1953, by Cousteau and Dumas) and Plongées sans câble (1954, by Philippe Tailliez).

1950–1970s
In 1949, Cousteau left the French Navy.

In 1950, he founded the French Oceanographic Campaigns (FOC), and leased a ship called Calypso from Thomas Loel Guinness for a symbolic one franc a year. Cousteau refitted the Calypso as a mobile laboratory for field research and as his principal vessel for diving and filming. He also carried out underwater archaeological excavations in the Mediterranean, in particular at Grand-Congloué (1952).

With the publication of his first book in 1953, The Silent World, Cousteau correctly predicted the existence of the echolocation abilities of porpoises. He reported that his research vessel, the Élie Monier, was heading to the Straits of Gibraltar and noticed a group of porpoises following them. Cousteau changed course a few degrees off the optimal course to the center of the strait, and the porpoises followed for a few minutes, then diverged toward mid-channel again. It was evident that they knew where the optimal course lay, even if the humans did not. Cousteau concluded that the cetaceans had something like sonar, which was a relatively new feature on submarines.

In 1954, Cousteau conducted a survey of Abu Dhabi waters on behalf of British Petroleum. Among those accompanying him was Louis Malle who made a black-and-white film of the expedition for the company. Cousteau won the Palme d'Or at the Cannes Film Festival in 1956 for The Silent World co-produced with Malle. In 1957, Cousteau took over as leader of the Oceanographic Museum of Monaco. Afterward, with the assistance of Jean Mollard, he made a "diving saucer" SP-350, an experimental underwater vehicle which could reach a depth of 350 meters. The successful experiment was quickly repeated in 1965 with two vehicles which reached 500 meters.

In 1957, he was elected as director of the Oceanographical Museum of Monaco. He directed Précontinent, about the experiments of diving in saturation (long-duration immersion, houses under the sea), and was admitted to the United States National Academy of Sciences.

He was involved in the creation of Confédération Mondiale des Activités Subaquatiques and served as its inaugural president from 1959 to 1973.

Cousteau also took part in inventing the "SP-350 Denise Diving Saucer" in 1959 which was an invention best for exploring the ocean floor, as it allowed one to explore on solid ground.

In October 1960, a large amount of radioactive waste was going to be discarded in the Mediterranean Sea by the Commissariat à l'énergie atomique (CEA). The CEA argued that the dumps were experimental in nature, and that French oceanographers such as Vsevelod Romanovsky had recommended it. Romanovsky and other French scientists, including Louis Fage and Jacques Cousteau, repudiated the claim, saying that Romanovsky had in mind a much smaller amount. The CEA claimed that there was little circulation (and hence little need for concern) at the dump site between Nice and Corsica, but French public opinion sided with the oceanographers rather than with the CEA atomic energy scientists. The CEA chief, Francis Perrin, decided to postpone the dump. Cousteau organized a publicity campaign which in less than two weeks gained wide popular support. The train carrying the waste was stopped by women and children sitting on the railway tracks, and it was sent back to its origin.

In the 1960s, Cousteau was involved with a set of three projects to build underwater "villages"; the projects were named Precontinent I, Precontinent II and Precontinent III. Each ensuing project was aimed at increasing the depth at which people continuously lived under water, and were an attempt at creating an environment in which men could live and work on the sea floor. The projects are best known as Conshelf I (1962), Conshelf II (1963), and Conshelf III (1965). The names "Precontinent", and "Continental Shelf Station" (Conshelf) were used interchangeably by Cousteau.

A meeting with American television companies (ABC, Métromédia, NBC) created the series The Undersea World of Jacques Cousteau, with the character of the commander in the red bonnet inherited from standard diving dress intended to give the films a "personalized adventure" style. This documentary television series ran for ten years from 1966 to 1976. A second documentary series, The Cousteau Odyssey, ran from 1977 to 1982 on public television stations.

In 1970, he wrote the book The Shark: Splendid Savage of the Sea with his son Philippe. In this book, Cousteau described the oceanic whitetip shark as "the most dangerous of all sharks".

In December 1972, two years after the volcano's last eruption, The Cousteau Society was filming Voyage au bout du monde on Deception Island, Antarctica, when Michel Laval, Calypsos second in command, was struck and killed by a rotor of the helicopter that was ferrying between Calypso and the island.

In 1973, along with his two sons and Frederick Hyman, he created the Cousteau Society for the Protection of Ocean Life, Frederick Hyman being its first President.

In 1975, John Denver released the tribute song "Calypso" on his album Windsong, and on the B-side of his hit song "I'm Sorry". "Calypso" became a hit on its own and was later considered the new A-side, reaching No. 2 on the charts.

In 1976, Cousteau located the wreck of HMHS Britannic. He also found the wreck of the French 17th-century ship-of-the-line La Therese in coastal waters of Crete.

In 1977, together with Peter Scott, he received the UN International Environment prize.

On 28 June 1979, while the Calypso was on an expedition to Portugal, his second son Philippe, his preferred and designated successor and with whom he had co-produced all his films since 1969, died in a PBY Catalina flying boat crash in the Tagus river near Lisbon. Cousteau was deeply affected. He called his eldest son, the architect Jean-Michel, to his side. This collaboration lasted 14 years.

1980–1990s
From 1980 to 1981, he was a regular on the animal reality show Those Amazing Animals, along with Burgess Meredith, Priscilla Presley, and Jim Stafford.

In 1980, Cousteau traveled to Canada to make two films on the Saint Lawrence River and the Great Lakes, Cries from the Deep and St. Lawrence: Stairway to the Sea.

In 1985, he received the Presidential Medal of Freedom from U.S. President Ronald Reagan.

From 1986 to 1992, Cousteau released Rediscovery of the World.

On 24 November 1988, he was elected to the Académie française, chair 17, succeeding Jean Delay. His official reception under the cupola took place on 22 June 1989, the response to his speech of reception being given by Bertrand Poirot-Delpech. After his death, he was replaced by Érik Orsenna on 28 May 1998.

In June 1990, the composer Jean Michel Jarre paid homage to the commander by entitling his new album Waiting for Cousteau. He also composed the music for Cousteau's documentary "Palawan, the last refuge".

On 2 December 1990, his wife, Simone Cousteau died of cancer.

In June 1991, in Paris, Jacques-Yves Cousteau remarried, to Francine Triplet, with whom he had (before this marriage) two children, Diane and Pierre-Yves. Francine Cousteau currently continues her husband's work as the head of the Cousteau Foundation and Cousteau Society. From that point, the relations between Jacques-Yves and his elder son, who is 8 years older than Francine, worsened.

In November 1991, Cousteau gave an interview to the UNESCO Courier, in which he stated that he was in favour of human population control and population decrease. Widely quoted on the Internet are these two paragraphs from the interview: "What should we do to eliminate suffering and disease? It's a wonderful idea but perhaps not altogether a beneficial one in the long run. If we try to implement it we may jeopardize the future of our species...It's terrible to have to say this. World population must be stabilized and to do that we must eliminate 350,000 people per day. This is so horrible to contemplate that we shouldn't even say it. But the general situation in which we are involved is lamentable".

In 1992, he was invited to Rio de Janeiro, Brazil, for the United Nations' International Conference on Environment and Development, and then he became a regular consultant for the UN and the World Bank.

In 1995, Cousteau became involved in a legal battle with his son Jean-Michel, who was advertising the "Cousteau Fiji Islands Resort" in the South Pacific, to prevent him from using the Cousteau name for business purposes in the United States. This resulted in Jean-Michel Cousteau being ordered by the court to not encourage confusion between his for-profit business and his father's non-profit endeavours.

On 11 January 1996, Calypso was accidentally rammed and sunk in the port of Singapore by a barge. The Calypso was refloated and towed home to France.

Religious views 
Though he was not particularly a religious man, Cousteau believed that the teachings of the different major religions provide valuable ideals and thoughts to protect the environment. In a Chapter entitled "The Holy Scriptures and The Environment" in the posthumous work The Human, the Orchid, and the Octopus, he is quoted as stating that "The glory of nature provides evidence that God exists".

Opinion on recreational fishing 
Cousteau said that just because fish are cold-blooded does not mean they do not feel pain, and that recreational fishermen only say so to reassure their conscience.

Death and legacy
Jacques-Yves Cousteau died of a heart attack on 25 June 1997 in Paris, two weeks after his 87th birthday. He was buried in the family vault at Saint-André-de-Cubzac, his birthplace. An homage was paid to him by the town by naming the street which runs out to the house of his birth "rue du Commandant Cousteau", where a commemorative plaque was placed.

Cousteau's legacy includes more than 120 television documentaries, more than 50 books, and an environmental protection foundation with 300,000 members.

Cousteau liked to call himself an "oceanographic technician". He was, in reality, a sophisticated showman, teacher, and lover of nature. His work permitted many people to explore the resources of the oceans.

His work also created a new kind of scientific communication, criticized at the time by some academics. The so-called "divulgationism", a simple way of sharing scientific concepts, was soon employed in other disciplines and became one of the most important characteristics of modern television broadcasting.

His Oceanographic Museum in Monaco, and perhaps even he himself, has been identified as introducing the Caulerpa "Killer Algae," which is destroying much of the Mediterranean's ecosystem.

The Cousteau Society and its French counterpart, l'Équipe Cousteau, both of which Jacques-Yves Cousteau founded, are still active today. The Society is currently attempting to turn the original Calypso into a museum and it is raising funds to build a successor vessel, the Calypso II.

In 2007, the International Watch Company introduced the IWC Aquatimer Chronograph "Cousteau Divers" Special Edition. The timepiece incorporated a sliver of wood from the interior of Cousteau's Calypso research vessel. Having developed the diver's watch, IWC offered support to The Cousteau Society. The proceeds from the timepieces' sales were partially donated to the non-profit organization involved in conservation of marine life and preservation of tropical coral reefs.

Fabien Cousteau, the grandson of Jacques Cousteau, is in the process of constructing a community of ocean flooring analysis stations, called Proteus, off Curaçao at a depth of about 20 m in a marine-protected area. Aquanauts could reside and work in these underwater habitats. Front-end engineering has started in 2022 with the habitat put on the sea bottom in 2025.

Awards and honors
During his lifetime, Jacques-Yves Cousteau received these distinctions:
 Cross of War 1939–1945 (1945)
 National Geographic Society's Special Gold Medal in 1961
 Commander of the Legion of Honour (1972)
 Officer of the Order of Maritime Merit (1980)
 Grand Cross of the National Order of Merit (1985)
 U.S. Presidential Medal of Freedom (1985)
 Induction into the Television Hall of Fame (1987)
 Elected to the Académie Française (1988)
 Commander of the Order of Arts and Letters
 Honorary Companion of the Order of Australia (26 January 1990)
Omicron Delta Kappa (1996)

Filmography

Legend

Bibliography
 The Silent World (1953, with Frédéric Dumas)
 Captain Cousteaus Underwater Treasury (1959, with James Dugan)
 The Living Sea (1963, with James Dugan)
 World Without Sun (1965)
 The Undersea Discoveries of Jacques-Yves Cousteau (1970–1975, 8-volumes, with Philippe Diolé)
 The Shark: Splendid Savage of the Sea (1970)
 Diving for Sunken Treasure (1971)
 Life and Death in a Coral Sea (1971)
 The Whale: Mighty Monarch of the Sea (1972)
 Octopus and Squid: The Soft Intelligence (1973)
 Three Adventures: Galápagos, Titicaca, the Blue Holes (1973)
 Diving Companions: Sea Lion, Elephant Seal, Walrus (1974)
 Dolphins (1975)
 The Ocean World of Jacques Cousteau (1973–78, 21 volumes)
 Oasis in Space (vol 1)
 The Act of Life (vol 2)
 Quest for Food (vol 3)
 Window in the Sea (vol 4)
 The Art of Motion (vol 5)
 Attack and Defense (vol 6)
 Invisible Messages (vol 7)
 Instinct and Intelligence (vol 8)
 Pharaohs of the Sea (vol 9)
 Mammals in the Sea (vol 10)
 Provinces of the Sea (vol 11)
 Man Re-Enters Sea (vol 12)
 A Sea of Legends (vol 13)
 Adventure of Life (vol 14)
 Outer and Inner Space (vol 15)
 The Whitecaps (vol 16)
 Riches of the Sea (vol 17)
 Challenges of the Sea (vol 18)
 The Sea in Danger (vol 19)
 Guide to the Sea and Index (vol 20)
 Calypso (1978, vol 21)
 A Bill of Rights for Future Generations (1979)
 Life at the Bottom of the World (1980)
 The Cousteau United States Almanac of the Environment (1981, a.k.a.  The Cousteau Almanac of the Environment: An Inventory of Life on a Water Planet)
 Jacques Cousteau's Calypso (1983, with Alexis Sivirine)
 Marine Life of the Caribbean (1984, with James Cribb and Thomas H. Suchanek)
 Jacques Cousteau's Amazon Journey (1984, with Mose Richards)
 Jacques Cousteau: The Ocean World (1985)
 The Whale (1987, with Philippe Diolé)
 Jacques Cousteau: Whales (1988, with Yves Paccalet)
 The Human, The Orchid and The Octopus (and Susan Schiefelbein, coauthor; Bloomsbury 2007)

Media portrayals
Jacques Cousteau has been portrayed in films:
 The American comedy film The Life Aquatic with Steve Zissou, directed by Wes Anderson and first released in December 2004, portrays Steve Zissou, a fictional oceanographer strongly inspired by Jacques Cousteau.
 The French film The Odyssey, directed by Jérôme Salle and first released in October 2016, focuses on Cousteau's life, especially regarding his relation with his first wife, Simone Melchior, and his second son, Philippe Cousteau.
Jacques Cousteau was featured in Epic Rap Battle of History's sixth season, and was portrayed by Peter Shukoff. He faced off against Steve Irwin, portrayed by Lloyd Ahlquist.

See also
 Becoming Cousteau, a 2021 full-length film biography
 
 
 
 
 List of Legion of Honour recipients by name (C)

References

Further reading
 Undersea Explorer: The Story of Captain Cousteau (1957) by James Dugan
 Jacques Cousteau and the Undersea World (2000) by Roger King
 Jacques-Yves Cousteau: His Story Under the Sea (2002) by John Bankston
 Jacques Cousteau: A Life Under the Sea (2008) by Kathleen Olmstead

External links
    

 The Cousteau Society
 
 
 Jacques Cousteau centennial: 'The sea is everything'
 Ocean Treasures Memorial Library
 Ocean Treasures Memorial Library/Jacques-Yves Cousteau Memorial
 Ocean Treasures Memorial Library/His Legacy
 Ocean Treasures Memorial Library/Photos

 
French marine biologists
1910 births
1997 deaths
20th-century French biologists
20th-century explorers
20th-century photographers
BAFTA fellows
Collège Stanislas de Paris alumni
Commandeurs of the Légion d'honneur
Jacques
Directors of Best Documentary Feature Academy Award winners
Directors of Palme d'Or winners
Foreign associates of the National Academy of Sciences
French documentary filmmakers
French explorers
20th-century French inventors
French military personnel of World War II
French Navy officers
French oceanographers
French photographers
French underwater divers
Grand Cross of the Ordre national du Mérite
History of scuba diving
Honorary Companions of the Order of Australia
Howard N. Potts Medal recipients
International Emmy Founders Award winners
Members of the Académie Française
Member of the Academy of the Kingdom of Morocco
Officers of the Ordre du Mérite Maritime
Sportspeople from Gironde
Presidential Medal of Freedom recipients
Recipients of the Croix de Guerre 1939–1945 (France)
Sierra Club awardees
Underwater photographers
20th-century French writers
20th-century French zoologists
Underwater filmmakers
Diving engineers